Labh Singh Ugoke  is an Indian politician and the MLA in the Punjab Legislative Assembly representing the Bhadaur Assembly constituency in Punjab, India, since 2022. Prior to entering politics, he owned a mobile repair shop in his village. He is a member of the Aam Aadmi Party.

Member of Legislative Assembly
He represents the Bhadaur Assembly constituency as MLA in Punjab Assembly.

Committee assignments of Punjab Legislative Assembly   
Member (2022–23) Committee on Welfare of Scheduled Castes, Scheduled Tribes and Backward Classes
Member (2022–23) Committee on Petitions

Electoral performance
In 2022 Punjab Legislative Assembly election Ugoke defeated the incumbent Chief minister of Punjab, Charanjit Singh Channi. The Aam Aadmi Party gained a strong 79% majority in the sixteenth Punjab Legislative Assembly by winning 92 out of 117 seats in the 2022 Punjab Legislative Assembly election. MP Bhagwant Mann was sworn in as Chief Minister on 16 March 2022.

Personal life
His mother Baldev Kaur worked as a sweeper in a government run school.

References 

Living people
Punjab, India MLAs 2022–2027
Aam Aadmi Party politicians from Punjab, India
Year of birth missing (living people)